Johann Wolf (26 May 1765 in Nürnberg – 16 February 1824) was a German naturalist and ornithologist.

He was a Member of the German Academy of Sciences Leopoldina.

Works
Neue methodische Vorschriften für Erziehungs- und Schulanstalten
Naturgeschichte der Vögel Deutschlands,
Taschenbuch der Vogelkunde für Deutschland, Nürnberg 1810
Abbildung und Beschreibung der Kreuzotter, Nürnberg 1815;
Abbildungen und Beschreibung merkwürdiger naturwissenschaftlicher Gegenstände, 2 Bände, Nürnberg 1818–1822
Ein sicheres und wohlfeiles Mittel, Insekten schnell und ohne Verletzung zu tödten, Nürnberg, 1803
''Der Steinkrebs, Nürnberg, 1805

References
Wilhelm Heß: Wolf, Johann (Pädagoge). In: Allgemeine Deutsche Biographie (ADB). Band 43, Duncker & Humblot, Leipzig 1898, S. 764 f. Siehe seite=766/767

German ornithologists
German naturalists
Scientists from Nuremberg
1765 births
1824 deaths